Paola Tattini (born 13 February 1958) is a former Italian female sport shooter who won medals at individual senior level at the World Championships and European Championships.

Biography
After her competitive career in trap (shotgun), Paola Tattini dedicated herself to the practice of helice shooting, obtaining some good results as a gold medal at the European Championships in Castanea delle Furie, Messina won in 2019.

In December 2019 she received the important honor of the Golden Collar for sporting merit from the Italian National Olympic Committee.

Honours
 CONI: Golden Collar of Sports Merit: Collare d'Oro al Merito Sportivo (2019)

See also
Trap World Champions

References

External links
 

1958 births
Trap and double trap shooters
Italian female sport shooters
Living people